Rembrandt Custodians Ltd v Pro-Drill (Auck) Ltd is an often referenced case in New Zealand credit circles of the hazards of issuing a Statutory Demand against a company to make them pay a disputed account.

Background
Pro-Drill invoiced Rembrandt on 29 November 2002 for $5,185.97 of drilling work. This invoice remained unpaid as of 20 January, which Rembrandt later stated was simply overlooked over the Christmas period.

Unaware of this, Pro-Drill referred this account to Law Debt Collection for debt collection, and immediately sent out a demand letter.

However, before Rembrandt had received this letter, they had paid this account on 9 February 2003. This left Law Debt Collection's fee of $1,037.19, which Rembrandt disputed liability for as they claimed that $1,037.19 for issuing just one letter was not reasonable and it was "out of proportion with all commercial reality".

Law Debt Collection, rather than credit this fee as most professional debt collection agencies would have, served a statutory demand on Rembrandt in order to get paid. To further complicate matters, the demand was signed by a Law Debt Collection, and not by their client or by a solicitor.

Rembrandt applied to the High Court to have the statutory demand set aside.

Decision
The High Court set aside the Statutory Demand on the grounds that due to the serious nature and consequences of a statutory demand (i.e. liquidation of the company) the issuer is required to be satisfied that the amount demanded is not in dispute, which in turn requires that the person issuing the demand be the creditor’s solicitor and not the creditor himself or the debt collection agency.

The judge went further and stated that he was confident that if a solicitor had first checked the correspondence relating to the debt they would have advised against the issue of a statutory demand.

Given all this, the judge ordered Pro-Drill to pay Rembrandt's full legal costs of $4,250.38 on a solicitor/client basis.

High Court of New Zealand cases
2003 in case law
2003 in New Zealand law